Aleksandr Tarasenya (born 25 September 1996) is a Belarusian professional footballer who plays for Ivatsevichi.

References

External links 
 
 
 Profile at teams.by

1996 births
Living people
Sportspeople from Brest Region
People from Lyakhavichy
Belarusian footballers
Association football forwards
FC Granit Mikashevichi players
FC Ivatsevichi players